Joël David Lionel Dielna (born 27 December 1990) is a French footballer who plays as a defender.

Career
He signed for Blackpool on 12 August 2014 and made his first-team debut for the club the same day as a 56th-minute substitute in a League Cup fixture against Shrewsbury Town.

In September 2017 he signed for Nuneaton Town. He got sent off on his debut.

On 30 November 2018, he signed for Hereford, arriving from Nuneaton. He joined Oxford City on an initial one month loan on 1 February 2019.

Career statistics

References

External links
 Profile at vocfoot.net
 
 Profile at foot-national.com
 

Living people
Blackpool F.C. players
1990 births
Association football forwards
French footballers
Vannes OC players
CD Gerena players
Solihull Moors F.C. players
AFC Telford United players
Nuneaton Borough F.C. players
Hereford F.C. players
Oxford City F.C. players
English Football League players
National League (English football) players
French expatriate footballers
French expatriate sportspeople in England
Expatriate footballers in England